Rahimabad is a village in the Leghari Estate in Rahim Yar Khan District of Punjab, Pakistan. It is approximately 24 kilometers west of Sadiqabad.

Villages in Rahim Yar Khan District